"La voix du bon Dieu" (meaning "Good God's Voice") is the second single by Canadian singer Celine Dion, released on 16 November 1981, in Quebec, Canada. It's also the title track from her debut album. On 28 November 1981 the song entered the chart in Quebec, spending there thirteen weeks and peaking at number 11. The single's B-side included "Autour de moi".

Background
While the version of the song included on the album of the same title contained generic back-up singers, the entire Dion family accompanied Dion's 1981 vocal track for a new version included on Tellement j'ai d'amour.... A third version of "La voix du bon Dieu" was included on her album Les oiseaux du bonheur, released in France in 1984. This track included a new vocal recording and softer orchestrations.

The second version of "La voix du bon Dieu" was included on Dion's 1986 compilation Les chansons en or and her 2005 French greatest hits compilation On ne change pas. The third version was included on the 1997 compilation C'est pour vivre and the 2002 CD re-release of her first album in France, called Du soleil au cœur.

Track listings and formats
Canadian 7" single
"La voix du bon Dieu" – 3:16
"Autour de moi" – 2:58

Charts

References

1981 singles
1981 songs
Celine Dion songs
French-language songs
Pop ballads
Song recordings produced by Eddy Marnay
Songs written by Eddy Marnay
Song recordings produced by René Angélil